The singles discography of Wanda Jackson, an American recording artist, consists of 81 singles, nine international singles, one other charted song, and three music videos. In 1954 at age 16, she signed as a country artist with Decca Records. Her debut single was a duet recording with Billy Gray which reached the eighth spot on the Billboard Hot Country Singles chart, also in 1954. Refusing to tour until completing high school, Jackson's further singles for Decca failed gaining success. She signed with Capitol Records in 1956 and began incorporating rock and roll into her musical style. Jackson's first Capitol single exemplified this format ("I Gotta Know") and became a national top-20 country hit. Follow-up rock singles between 1957 and 1959 failed gaining enough attention to become hits including, "Hot Dog! That Made Him Mad", "Fujiyama Mama", and "Honey Bop". In 1960 however, the rock and roll-themed, "Let's Have a Party", became Jackson's first Billboard top-40 pop hit after it was picked up by an Iowa disc jockey.

As rock and roll's popularity declined, Jackson started releasing singles targeted specifically toward the country market. Her 1961 releases, "Right or Wrong" and "In the Middle of a Heartache", became top-10 hits on the Billboard country chart respectively. Further country pop releases from 1962 to 1964 became minor Billboard country and pop hits; "A Little Bitty Tear", "If I Cried Every Time You Hurt Me", and "Slippin'". In 1965, Jackson started recording in German as well as English. Her debut German single, "Santo Domingo", went to number five in Germany and a series of international singles followed suit. Continuing as a country performer, most of Jackson's singles peaked in the top 40 on the country chart. Considered "self-assertive" song names by critics, titles included, "The Box It Came In" (1966), "Tears Will Be the Chaser for Your Wine" (1966), "A Girl Don't Have to Drink to Have Fun" (1967), "My Baby Walked Right Out on Me" (1968), and "My Big Iron Skillet" (1969).

In 1971, Jackson converted to Christianity and recorded a gospel single that year entitled "People Gotta Be Loving". Before signing to the Christian label, Word Records, Jackson had two top-20 Billboard country hits with "A Woman Lives for Love" (1970) and "Fancy Satin Pillows" (1971). Through Word and later Myrrh Records, she issued several Christian and gospel singles until the end of the 1970s such as "Jesus Put a Yodel in My Soul" (1974). She spent the next decade recording gospel music and performing religious touring shows, until European rock and roll revivalists sought out Jackson. From the renewed success, Jackson issued two rock and roll singles in the 1980s including, "My Party" (1988), a duet with Karel Zich. In the 1990s, she primarily toured as a rock and gospel artist without releasing any singles. After several more album releases in the 2000s, Jack White of the successful rock band, The White Stripes, produced Jackson's comeback album, The Party Ain't Over. The release spawned Jackson's first pair of singles since the 1980s: "Thunder on the Mountain" and "You Know I'm No Good".

Singles

1950s

1960s

1970s

1980s–2020s

International singles

As a featured artist

Other charted songs

Music videos

Notes

References

External links 
 Official Website

Discographies of American artists
Rock music discographies
Country music discographies
Christian music discographies